St. Peter's/Cape George Water Aerodrome  is located on Bras d'Or Lake,  northeast of St. Peter's, Nova Scotia, Canada.

References

Registered aerodromes in Nova Scotia
Seaplane bases in Nova Scotia
Buildings and structures in Richmond County, Nova Scotia